Maduvvaree as a place name may refer to:
 Maduvvaree (Lhaviyani Atoll) (Republic of Maldives)
 Maduvvaree (Meemu Atoll) (Republic of Maldives)
 Maduvvaree (Raa Atoll) (Republic of Maldives)